Fiction is the only album released by Christian artists Mukala.

Track listing 
All tracks by Dan Muckala except where noted.

 "Soap" (Alex Anders, Muckala) – 3:47
 "Skip to the End" – 3:42
 "Stranger Than Fiction" – 4:33
 "Regret" (Ty Lacy, Muckala) – 4:28
 "High" – 6:10
 "Original Sin" – 4:54	
 "Atrocity" – 4:22	
 "Story of Her Life" – 4:39	
 "Ice Age" – 4:17	
 "Jesus Shirt" – 4:04

Personnel 
Dan Muckala – lead vocals, keyboard, producer, engineer
Alex Nifong – guitar, vocals
Jason Collum – drums
Brent Milligan – bass
Paul Jenkins – engineer
Bob Wohler – executive producer
Robert Beeson – executive producer
F. Reid Shippen – mixing

References

1998 albums
Mukala albums
Essential Records (Christian) albums